Asimitellaria is a genus of flowering plants in the family Saxifragaceae that is native to Japan and Taiwan. Formerly a section in the genus Mitella, Asimitellaria was elevated to genus rank in 2021.

Species
As of April 2021, species include:
  (Makino) R.A.Folk & Y.Okuyama
 Asimitellaria amamiana (Y.Okuyama) R.A.Folk & Y.Okuyama
 Asimitellaria doiana  (Ohwi) R.A.Folk & Y.Okuyama
 Asimitellaria formosana  (Hayata) R.A.Folk & Y.Okuyama
 Asimitellaria furusei  (Ohwi) R.A.Folk & Y.Okuyama
 Asimitellaria japonica  (Maxim.) R.A.Folk & Y.Okuyama
 Asimitellaria kiusiana  (Makino) R.A.Folk & Y.Okuyama
   (Ohwi) R.A.Folk & Y.Okuyama
   (Rosend.) R.A.Folk & Y.Okuyama
 Asimitellaria stylosa  (H.Boissieu) R.A.Folk & Y.Okuyama
 Asimitellaria yoshinagae  (Hara) R.A.Folk & Y.Okuyama

References

Saxifragaceae genera
Flora of Japan
Flora of Taiwan